Acrocercops cylicota is a moth of the family Gracillariidae, known from Karnataka and Maharashtra, India. It was described by Edward Meyrick in 1914. The hostplants for the species include Colebrookea oppositifolia and Elsholtzia fruticosa.

References

cylicota
Moths of Asia
Moths described in 1914